Nighat Chaudhry (Urdu: نگہت چودھری) is born on 24 February, in Lahore, Pakistan and moved to London when she was one year old. She is a trained Sufi & Mystique Kathak classical dancer. She started her journey from London and has been active as a professional Kathak dancer for over three decades. She studied ballet and contemporary dance. She met Nahid Siddiqui at age of fourteen, regarded as one of the greatest Kathak dancers and trained under her guidance. Inspired to learn the classical forms of her own culture, she abandoned ballet and join to understand and absorb the nuances of the style. This required her to be closer to its origins and she moved back to Pakistan.

Early life

Education
She completed her formal education from London in O and A levels and is certified in a Dance Foundation Course from the Laban Center for Movement and Dance, Goldsmiths College, London.
Presently acquired a master's degree in professional practice in dance technique pedagogy from Middlesex University London and a Certified Skill Diploma In Choreography from Jain University Bangalore.

Kathak training and courses
 Certificate in Classical ballet and Creative Dance at Fulham Gilliatt and Rambert, London.1970-76
 Classical Kathak Dance training under Nahid Siddiqui, London.1977-83
 Classical Kathak Dance training under Maharaj Ghulam Hussain Kathak,
Lahore.1983-87
 Trained with two advance intensive workshops at Kumudini Lakhia, London.1981/91
 Advance classical kathak training under Pandit Durga Lal and Uma Durga at kathak Kendra, Delhi. 1988-92
 Summer intensive Kathak Workshop at Bharatiya Vidya Bhavan Educational Trust with Saswati Sen, the seniormost disciple of Pandit Birju Maharaj. 2015
 Completed Grade 3 certificate under Pali Chandra Gurukul, the renowned Kathak Guru, Dubai. 2016

Family background
She belongs to a literary family from her father's side and the business world from her mother's side. Her grandfather from her maternal side had a renowned business by the name of Chaudhry hosiery mills before partition in Dacca, Ludhiana, Lahore and Faisalabad, while her father Abdur-rehman Chaudhry was a professor who taught mathematics as his subject at University of Agriculture Faisalabad eventually moving on to becoming a professor at Government College University (Lahore). Farooq Chaudhry is her brother, who graduated with a bachelor's in Dance Performance from The Place (Sadler's Wells Theatre) in London and performed as an international professional dancer in the eighties and nineties. He received an Asian Achievement Award for his work as a performer in 1988.
In 1999, he retired from dancing and completed an MA in Arts Management from City, University of London.
In 2000, Farooq Chaudhry co-founded the Akram Khan company with Akram Khan (dancer) and became the company producer. He has had leadership roles as a producer for the English National Ballet in October 2013 and an international executive director for China's National Dance icon Yang Liping since 2016.

Career

Professional history
In 1985, she was inducted as an air hostess with British Airways (Karachi Base). She was appointed as a lead kathak dancer in Nahid Siddiqui's Dance Company London in 1996. Then in 2001, she started working as a director of PNCA Pakistan National Council of the Arts. She created a dance syllabus and taught as a performing arts dance instructor at Lahore Grammar School in 2010. In 2012 she taught dance as a dance teacher at HeadStart School Islamabad. In 2013 she taught at Kuch khaas Center for Arts culture & dialogue and Liberal Arts High School Islamabad. Presently, she is teaching dance at Faiz Ghar and her own institute, Institute of Performing Arts.

Performances as a cultural artist
In 1994, she performed Kathak Solo performance at the FTC auditorium Karachi launching self-choreographed dance work. In 1995, she accompanied Benazir Bhutto (Late Prime–Minister of Pakistan) in a cultural troupe to Turkmenistan, London and the USA projecting a soft and strong cultural image of Pakistan through her lectures, workshops and magnificent dance performances. She choreographed and danced in a ballet on the life of the late Prime Minister Zulfikar Ali Bhutto on his death anniversary in Larkana Pakistan and gained tremendous recognition for her outstanding talent. She performed in all the World Performing Arts Festival in Pakistan hosted by Rafi Peer Theatre Workshop. It was continued from 1995 until 2013. In 2003, she performed for Arts Council of Pakistan to Promoting Cultural events for the music Committee Karachi. In 2004, she performed a Kathak Performance at the Kodak-HRD Congress Serena Hotel Islamabad.
In 2005, she choreographed and performed in Lux Style Awards and TVOne Global Launch show. In 2005, she performed at the Presidency for President Pervez Musharraf on 23 March Pakistan Day.
In 2008, she performed for the Pakistan Embassy Spain in an event called Qalandarbass to promote and support the development of Pakistan's cultural diversity. In 2009, she performed for the World Population Foundation an evening called International Mother's Night Islamabad. In 2013, she performed for PC (Pearl-Continental Hotels & Resorts) events in Islamabad, Karachi, Lahore and Peshawar for promotion of Classical Dance in Pakistan. In 2013, she performed a KATHAK and HIP-HOP Fusion on International Dance Day at Kuch Khaas Islamabad, Pakistan and performed in All Pakistan Music Conference, Lahore. She also performed in Gala Evening Pakistan Chest Society with Rahat Fateh Ali Khan, IBEX Club Lake View, Islamabad. She performed in South Asia Labour Conference at Hazuri Bagh, Lahore, Pakistan. In 2014, she performed in a Sufi Kathak musical evening in Multan, organized by the Honorary Consulate General of Paraguay in honor of the ambassador of the Argentines. She performed in a tribute to the famous poet Faiz Ahmad Faiz Book launch in Sindhi by Government of Sindh, Karachi, Pakistan and performed in 5th Alhamra International Conference (Beetay Hoay Din Yaad Aatey Hain) in Al-hamra Cultural Complex. She also performed in Raqs Mein Hai Sara Jahan as "Dancing Away Differences", celebrating International Dance Day at the Art Council, Karachi. She Presented Nuqta a special Sufi Dance performance with live music and poetry on the occasion of the 14th Daniel Pearl World Music Day 2015 in collaboration with kuch khaas and the U.S. embassy. She participated as a dance choreographer/trainer in a sixth workshop on capacity building and skills development to strengthen local theatre artists’ capacity to use theatre to promote social change in Southern Punjab, organized by international alerts Pakistan in collaboration with SRAM Studios, Pakistan.

Performances as a cultural ambassador
She was noticed for her extraordinary dance talent and was chosen to represent Pakistan in the Asian Advertising Congress in Seoul, South Korea in 1985 and the Great hall of China in 1987. In 1995, she was invited by Citibank and had the honor to perform for the ex-Prime Minister of Great Britain Margaret Thatcher at the Lahore Fort. In 2009, she performed at Agha Khan Foundation A collaborative dance performance for the Worlds of the Indian Ocean in Karachi Invited by the Pakistan Embassy to Perform for a charity show in Morocco for the Royal family of Morocco.
In 2012, she performed at the Wief Johor Bahru Malaysia 8th World Islamic Economic Forum. In 2016, she choreographed and performed as Cultural leading ambassador, in the World Cultural Festival among 155 countries at the platform of the Art Of Living Sri Sri Ravi Shankar in Delhi India. She has performed to great acclaim in many countries around the world like Japan, China, Sicily, Rome, Singapore, India, England, Austria, France, Germany, Mauritius, and US. Apart from participating in a number of the International Dance and Theatre Festivals in Pakistan, she has represented the country on platforms like the American Dance Festival in the States, and the Young Dancer's Festival in India, and many others.

Performances of Pakistan television
1996 Cricket World Cup was hosted in Pakistan, Nighat Chaudhry was chosen to present a cultural festival in all the major cities, she choreographed for a group of 35 dancers where she acted and danced the character Sassi (A folk legend of Sindh) and the legendary Anarkali in a dance ballet which was also televised for Pakistan Television. She has performed on numerous occasions in Pakistan such as Eid, National Days and Award Ceremonies for PTV and other T.V channels since 1995 to 2010. She performed in PTV numerous significant thematic performances on. She performed for Pakistan Television for a classical musical programme called RAAG GALA in 2013. She performed for the anniversary for the PTV World, A solo and with famous Sufi singer of Pakistan Abida Parveen in 2014. She performed and choreographed for Firdous-E-Gosh, a Classic Musical Soiree, produced by PTV Pakistan Television in 2015.

Performances for fund raising
Nighat Chaudhry performed raising funds for many charities in Pakistan such as the Cancer Society, Association for Children with Emotional and Learning Problems, SOS Children's Villages and UNICEF. In 1991, she performed for Imran Khan’s cancer hospital, a Kathak Guitar fusion with Salman of Junoon. In 1995, she performed for UNICEF in Islamabad. In 2012, to promote peace and love she also performed with the Sufi rock group JUNOON on the platform "United for Peace" a benefit concert for world Peace. In 2013, she also presented a dance to empower women called Strike Dance Rise, a celebration of women's courage and their determination to live and rise for justice, an e global campaign called One Billion Rising for Justice, in collaboration between Kuch Khaas and the Islamabad-based AMAL Human Development Network.

Performances at festivals
Nighat Chaudhry has performed to great acclaim in many festivals around the world as well as International Dance and Theatre Festivals in Pakistan.
She performed in the American Dance Festival Duke University North Carolina and Faiz Ahmad Faiz Mela Karachi in 1991.
She performed in the Young Dancer's and Raindrops festival at the Iskon Hare Rama Hare Krishna center Mumbai India in 1992.
She performed a Kathak Solo in the first National Dance Festival Held by the Rafi Peer Theatre Karachi in 1995.
She performed in the Mauritius Festival of solidarity for children in the Indian Ocean in 1996.
She performed in the International Mystic Music Sufi Festival in Karachi Rafi Peer Theatre Workshop in 2007.
In 2010, Nighat was invited by the Engendered Dance Festival New York to present her new dance work on women called Purdah. She performed at the Lincoln Center and Symphony Space. Her performance was reviewed by the ballet review as the most intense dance performance to come out from a country like Pakistan. She performed at the Wief Johor Bahru Malaysia 8th World Islamic Economic Forum in 2012.
She performed in the 2nd National Dance Festival, Lahore Rafi Peer Theatre workshop in 2013. She performed in a 5-day festival of music, poetry, literature and dance celebrating Amir Khusro's work Jamal-E-Khusro in 2014. In 2016, she choreographed and performed as Cultural leading ambassador, in the World Culture Festival amongst 155 countries at the platform of the Art Of Living Sri Sri Ravi Shankar in Delhi India.

Acting and on-screen appearances
In 1992 she started her career as actress; she performed in a video of Pakistan's first "Sufi Rock" Junoon (band), for MTV. She acted in mini-series "Mr. D.J" and "Shee Jee" and in two long plays: "Mystery Theatre" and "Raqeeb". Then she appeared in an interview with TV Asia, London. In 1993, she played a female lead role in PTV drama "Maig Malhar" – a love story of 13 episodes based on the division of Pakistan in 1971. She also awarded best actress award for this drama serial. Then she acted in "Jaal", Pakistan's first soap opera of 100 episodes, which went on air in Pakistan and on the satellite channel, Zee Tv from London. In 1994, she performed in NTM (Network Television Marketing) Prime Time Show. She choreographed and danced in a fusion of Kathak and Modern Dance to Nusrat Fateh Ali Khan’s song "Mera Piya Ghar Aya". She appeared in an interview with Weekend Masala on NTM. In 1996, she danced in a video based on the achievements of women called "Aurat", choreographed and danced to a concept on communications for NTM Viewers Awards. In 1996, the Cricket World Cup was hosted in Pakistan, Nighat Chaudhry was chosen to present a cultural festival in all the major cities, she choreographed for a group of 35 dancers where she acted and danced the character Sassi (A folk legend of Sindh) and the legendary Anarkali in a dance ballet which was also televised for Pakistan Television. In 2000, she acted in a long play, "Neeli Dhoop" and a TV serial "Sila". In 2002, she performed in a music video for Sufi Group Junoon. Poetry by Pakistan's renowned poet and philosopher Allama Iqbal, she acted in a serial called Ma shot in Scotland. In 2003, she acted in a Pakistani feature film, directed by Ajab Gul called Kyon tum se itna pyar hai.

Nighat Chaudhry Foundation (NCF)

Nighat Chaudhry established her NGO the Nighat Chaudhry Foundation in 2016 and her vision for NCF is to re-connect the people of Pakistan to their cultural identity to their heritage. She wants to establish performing arts as education, to document and preserve our cultural heritage, to prevent the decaying of its presence among us as a society.
Her aim and goal of the Nighat Chaudhry Foundation (NCF) is to encourage, empower and create a transformation space for the youth, the women and all the people of Pakistan, a platform to embrace our cultural heritage and performing arts as a means of human development, a healing of our cultural wounds and an evolving of our communities with a connection back into the cultural fabric and cultural roots of Pakistan. It gives her immense pleasure to present the Nighat Chaudhry Foundation to all the people of Pakistan and guide them towards a true ownership of a cultural heritage.

Awards and certificates

References

External links
 Nighat Chaodhry Website
Nighat Chaodhry Official Facebook Page
Nighat Chaodhry Official Youtube Channel

Pakistani female dancers
Living people
Pakistani television actresses
Pakistani artists
Punjabi people
1959 births
Recipients of the Pride of Performance
Kathak exponents